Ibrahim El Moallem is an Egyptian businessman, and the chairman of Shorouk Group, as well as holding major shares in various publishing and media companies in Egypt and the Middle East region.

Biography
Starting his publishing career in the late 1960s, Ibrahim El Moallem worked with his father Mohamad El-Moallem in Dar El-Shorouk, contributing to its expansion in Beirut and the establishment of Shorouk Press. In 1982, Ibrahim El-Moallem published the first Arabic book to win an international publishing prize at the Leipzig Book Fair, and in the late 1980s, Shorouk's board of directors chaired by Mohamed El-Moallem appointed him president of Dar El-Shorouk.

El Moallem has also been the elected president of the Egyptian Publishers Association (EPA) since 1996. He was president of the Arab Publishers Association (APA) from 1996 to 2007. He was the first Arab to be elected member of the Executive Committee, and the Freedom to Publish Committee in the International Publishers Association (IPA) and, in October 2008, he was elected vice president of IPA, the first Arab to reach this level.

He served for several years as an elected board member of Al-Ahly sports club. He is also the head of the Egyptian Council for Film and Book Export.

El Moallem has received a number of awards, including the Mediterranean Media Award in February 2009.

References
 The World is Not Enough (Interview)
 
 A Difficult Silence (Interview)
 Pride and Prejudice (Interview)

Lebanese publishers (people)
Living people
Year of birth missing (living people)